Bratina Island is a small island lying at the north tip of Brown Peninsula in the Ross Ice Shelf. It was named by the Advisory Committee on Antarctic Names in 1963 for Chief Aviation Machinists Mate Joseph Bratina, U.S. Navy Squadron VX-6, stationed at McMurdo Station in the 1958–59, 1960–61 and 1961–62 summer seasons.

Bratina Lagoon is located on the southwest side of Bratina Island.

See also 
 List of antarctic and sub-antarctic islands

References

 

Islands of Victoria Land
Scott Coast